Olivia Kate Cooke (born 27 December 1993) is an English actress. In television, she has starred as Emma Decody in the thriller Bates Motel (2013–2017), Becky Sharp in the period drama Vanity Fair (2018), and Alicent Hightower in the fantasy drama House of the Dragon (2022–present). 

In film, Cooke has starred in the horror film Ouija (2014), the comedy-drama film Me and Earl and the Dying Girl (2015), the thriller Thoroughbreds (2017), the science fiction film Ready Player One (2018), and the drama Sound of Metal (2020).

Early life
Olivia Kate Cooke was born on 27 December 1993 in Oldham, Greater Manchester, to sales representative Lindsay Wilde and police officer John Cooke. Her parents divorced when she was a child, and she and her sister lived with their mother. She started acting when she was eight years old at the Oldham Theatre Workshop, an after-school drama programme in her hometown. She attended Royton and Crompton Academy and studied drama at Oldham Sixth Form College, leaving before the end of her A-levels to appear in the drama series Blackout. She starred as Maria in a college production of West Side Story, and soon landed her first and last leading role for the Oldham Theatre Workshop in Prom: The Musical, a remake of Cinderella. When she was 14, she secured her first local agent, who gained her commercial roles. In 2012, she appeared in One Direction's "Autumn Term" tour video as a student getting a piggyback ride from Harry Styles. Although her agent discouraged her from enrolling in drama school because she was already getting acting work, she was keen on applying to the Royal Academy of Dramatic Art (RADA) and made it to the final round of auditions, but was not accepted. As of 2020, she lives in London.

Career

2012–2014: Beginnings 
After Cooke performed at the Oldham Theatre Workshop, Beverley Keogh, a casting director next door to her agency, secured her roles in television. Cooke starred in all three BBC mini-series productions in 2012: Blackout, as the daughter of Christopher Eccleston's character, and The Secret of Crickley Hall, as a young teacher at a tyrannical orphanage in the 1940s. Cooke stated that she felt better suited for television than theatre, as she was embarrassed by the exaggerated gestures sometimes required for stage acting. Despite being a novice, Cooke distinguished herself among European actresses in the gruelling casting process for The Quiet Ones, which opened in April 2014, two years after filming took place.

In 2012, following The Quiet Ones, Cooke acquired an agent in Los Angeles. After reading the character descriptions for A&E's contemporary Psycho prequel Bates Motel, she sent an audition tape for the role of Emma Decody. Three weeks later, Cooke earned the part of Emma, her first American role. She was originally disappointed when the producers made Emma Mancunian, believing it was a fail-safe measure regarding her accent. However, aided by fellow English actor Freddie Highmore, who has previous experience with an American accent, Cooke has since been mistaken to be American. Cooke also contributed short videos for Emma's fictitious blog.

Cooke's second feature film The Signal, with Brenton Thwaites and Laurence Fishburne, opened at the 2014 Sundance Film Festival. Cooke starred as Haley Peterson, an American MIT student transferring to Caltech, who encounters strange occurrences as she, her boyfriend, and her best friend are lured into the desert by a hacker. In October 2014, Cooke led the cast of Ouija, a horror film based on Hasbro's board game. The role of the protagonist, Laine Morris, was a major undertaking for Cooke, who appeared in almost every scene. The story centred around a group of friends who use the Ouija board to contact a deceased friend, but end up awakening a dark presence. Despite being panned by critics, Ouija was a box office success, grossing approximately $102.5 million worldwide.

2015–present: Progression 
Cooke next appeared in the comedy-drama film Me and Earl and the Dying Girl. For the coming-of-age tale by Jesse Andrews, who adapted the original novel for the film, Cooke shaved off her hair to play the female lead who battles leukaemia. The film premiered at the Sundance Film Festival, where it was awarded both the Grand Jury and Audience Awards. Also in 2015, Cooke voiced the Loch Ness Monster for an episode of Axe Cop, which was co-written by her Me and Earl and the Dying Girl co-star Nick Offerman.

Cooke played the titular character in the independent drama film Katie Says Goodbye, alongside Jim Belushi, Mireille Enos, Christopher Abbott, and Mary Steenburgen. The film revolves around Katie, a 17-year-old waitress attempting to overcome poverty and start a new life in San Francisco by resorting to prostitution. She next starred in the film adaptation of Dan Leno and the Limehouse Golem, a gothic murder mystery, opposite Bill Nighy and Douglas Booth. Both films premiered at the 2016 Toronto International Film Festival. Cooke then starred in the thriller film Thoroughbreds, alongside Anya Taylor-Joy and Anton Yelchin, which premiered at the 2017 Sundance Film Festival.

Cooke starred as Art3mis in Steven Spielberg's science fiction adventure Ready Player One, which was released in March 2018. Later that year, she appeared alongside Oscar Isaac, Olivia Wilde and Samuel L. Jackson in Dan Fogelman's relationship drama film Life Itself, and played the lead character, Becky Sharp in the ITV production of Vanity Fair.

Cooke starred in the drama film Sound of Metal, alongside Riz Ahmed. The film premiered at the 2019 Toronto International Film Festival on 6 September 2019. Also in 2019, she appeared as Karla, pregnant homeless woman giving her baby up for adoption, in the Amazon Prime Video romantic comedy anthology series Modern Love. Since 2022, Cooke has played the role of Alicent Hightower, the "Green Queen," in HBO's House of the Dragon.

In the Apple TV+ series Slow Horses, Cooke appears as MI5 agent Sidonie "Sid" Baker.

Filmography

Film

Television

Music videos

Awards and nominations

References

External links

 

Living people
1993 births
21st-century English actresses
Actresses from Oldham
English film actresses
English television actresses
People from Royton